St. Xavier's Technical Institute (founded in 1937) is an electronics school in Mumbai, India. It is part of the Jesuit family of schools and began operations on the premises of St. Xavier's College, Mumbai. It was transferred to its own building in Mahim in June 1969. It was previously known as the Abdulla Fazalbhoy Technical Institute for Radio and Cinema.

Facilities
The Institute is a Tele Learning Centre of the Indira Gandhi National Open University (IGNOU) for the Bachelor of Information Technology and Advanced Diploma in Information Technology. This centre has a direct satellite link to receive the live video broadcast of the lectures with an audio link to New Delhi for students’ questions on the spot. The Institute provides facilities for professional and specialised training in electronics. The areas covered are Radio, Television, Video, Marine Electronics and Communications, Radar, Digital Electronics, Microprocessors, and Computer Software and Hardware. Developing "Thinking Skills" and "Personality Development" are required subjects for the Institute's full-time diplomas.

From June 1994, St. Xavier’s has been granted academic autonomy by the Government of Maharashtra. This means that the Institute conducts its own Diploma examinations which are recognised by Government as equivalent to those of the Board of Technical Education, Maharashtra. St. Xavier’s Technical Institute has set up a Software Development Centre. In 1999 the Directorate of Technical Education of Maharashtra State commissioned St. Xavier’s to set up an electronic network of 46 technical institutions across the state. This included the Directorate itself, the Directorate of Industry-Institute Co-ordination, the Board of Technical Education, and 43 other Institutions in the State. The project was funded by the World Bank.
The Institute's Marine Department has been awarded ISO 9001:2000 quality certification.

A separate project has been started for the computerisation of the Maharashtra State Board of Technical Education which controls technical examinations in the state. The project was awarded to St. Xavier’s Technical Institute. A second project for the computerisation of Holy Family Hospital and Research Centre and the new Holy Family Heart Institute with facilities like MRI and CAT SCAN has been awarded to the Institute. 
The State Board of Technical Education has awarded the Institute a project to provide an on-line examination for the government employee confirmatory test. This project includes the development of the Question Bank for the examination.

Courses offered
Diploma in Electronics & Tele-Communications Engineering (DETE)
Diploma in Marine Engineering

See also
 List of Jesuit sites

Footnotes

Jesuit universities and colleges in India
Universities and colleges in Mumbai
Educational institutions established in 1937
1937 establishments in India